Oligodon cyclurus (Cantor's kukri snake) is a species of snake found in Asia. It was first described by Theodore Cantor in 1839.

Distribution 
India (Assam), Bangladesh, Nepal, Myanmar (Burma), Thailand, Laos, Cambodia, Vietnam, China (Yunnan).

Oligodon cyclurus dorsolateralis: Thailand, Myanmar (Burma), India (Assam).

References 

 Boulenger, George A. (1890). The Fauna of British India, Including Ceylon and Burma. Reptilia and Batrachia. Taylor & Francis, London, xviii, 541 pp.
 Cantor, T. E. 1839 Spicilegium serpentium indicorum [parts 1 and 2]. Proc. Zool. Soc. London 7: 31–34, 49–55.
 Das, I. (1996). Biogeography of the Reptiles of South Asia. Krieger Publishing Company, Malabar, Florida.
 Grossmann, W. (1992). Beitrag zur Biologie der Kukri-Natter Oligodon cyclurus smithi (WERNER, 1925). Sauria 14 (2): 3–10.

External links 
 

Cyclurus
Reptiles of Bangladesh
Reptiles of Myanmar
Reptiles of Cambodia
Reptiles of China
Reptiles of India
Reptiles of Laos
Reptiles of Nepal
Reptiles of Thailand
Reptiles of Vietnam
Taxa named by Theodore Edward Cantor
Reptiles described in 1839

Snakes of China
Snakes of Vietnam
Snakes of Asia